Makrychori (Katharevousa: Μακρυχώριον) is a former municipality in the Larissa regional unit, Thessaly, Greece. Since the 2011 local government reform it has been part of the municipality Tempi, of which it is a municipal unit. Population 2,553 (2011). The municipal unit has an area of 107.767 km2. The municipality was created under the Kapodistrias Law in 1997 out of the former communes of Elateia, Evangelismos, Gyrtoni and Parapotamos.

Subdivisions
The municipal unit Makrychori is subdivided into the following communities (constituent villages in brackets):
Elateia
Evangelismos
Makrychori (Makrychori, Gyrtoni)
Parapotamos

Population

Geography
Makrychori is located next to the Thessalian Plain, situated between the river Pineios and the GR-1/E75 (Athens - Larissa - Thessaloniki). The mountains can be seen to the west and east, the southern portions of the municipality are farmlands.

References

External links
 Mayrhchori (municipality) on GTP Travel Pages
 Makrychori (town) on GTP Travel Pages

Populated places in Larissa (regional unit)